Treadwell is an English surname and occasional given name. Notable people with the name include:

 Aaron Louis Treadwell (1866–1947), American professor of zoology
 Alexander Treadwell (born 1946), American politician from New York
 Anthony Treadwell (1922–2003), New Zealand architect, educator and painter
 Charles J. Treadwell (1920–2010), British diplomat 
 Daniel Treadwell (1791–1872), American inventor
 David Treadwell (born 1965), American football placekicker
 Demetrius Treadwell (born 1991), American basketball player
 Don Treadwell (born 1960), American football coach and player
 Elizabeth Treadwell (born 1967), American poet
 Frederick Pearson Treadwell (1857–1919), American-Swiss chemist
 Geoffrey Treadwell (1892–1967), South African cricket umpire
 George Treadwell (1918/9–1967), American jazz trumpeter
 Harold Treadwell (1897–1971), African-American baseball pitcher
 Harriet Taylor Treadwell (1870–1931), American educator, suffragist
 Jack L. Treadwell (1919–1977), United States Army officer
 James Treadwell, British former academic and author of fantasy novels
 John Treadwell (1745–1823), American politician from Connecticut
 John Treadwell (miner) (1842–1927), Canadian gold miner in Alaska
 Johnny Treadwell (1941–2014), American football player
 Laquon Treadwell (born 1995), American football wide receiver
 Liam Treadwell (1986–2020), English National Hunt jockey
 Marc Thomas Treadwell (born 1955), United States district judge
 Mead Treadwell (born 1956), American politician from Alaska
 Nicholas Treadwell (born 1937), British art dealer and gallery owner
 Oscar Treadwell (1926–2006), American jazz radio journalist and presenter
 Sophie Treadwell (1885–1970), American playwright and journalist
 Timothy Treadwell (1957–2003), American environmentalist
 Valentine Treadwell (c. 1813–1888), New York politician
 Treadwell Gibbons, Bermudian cricketer

See also
 Tredwell
 Dominic Treadwell-Collins (born 1977), British television producer